The Hilton Minneapolis in Minneapolis, on Marquette Avenue between 10th and 11th Street South. The hotel is known for its entrance with floor-to-ceiling windows, crystal chandeliers, marble floors and a custom art collection featuring Minnesota landmarks by Minnesota artists. It has 821 rooms and is 25 stories tall. It has a 25,000-square-foot ballroom and 35 meeting rooms. It is the largest hotel in the state of Minnesota.

The hotel was built in 1992. DiamondRock Hospitality purchased it in 2010 for $152 million and sold it in 2016 to Walton Street Capital for $143 million.

See also
List of tallest buildings in Minneapolis

References

External links
 - Official Website

Hilton Hotels & Resorts hotels
Skyscraper hotels in Minneapolis
1992 establishments in Minnesota
Hotel buildings completed in 1992
Hotels established in 1992